These are things named after W. V. D. Hodge, a Scottish mathematician.

 Hodge algebra
 Hodge–Arakelov theory
 Hodge bundle
 Hodge conjecture
 Hodge cycle
 Hodge–de Rham spectral sequence
 Hodge diamond
 Hodge duality
 Hodge filtration
 Hodge index theorem
 Hodge group
 Hodge star operator
 Hodge structure
 Mixed Hodge structure
 Hodge–Tate module
 Hodge theory
 Mixed Hodge module
 Hodge–Arakelov theory
 p-adic Hodge theory

Hodge